The men's 200 metre backstroke event at the 2010 Asian Games took place on 15 November 2010 at Guangzhou Aoti Aquatics Centre.

There were 23 competitors from 15 countries who took part in this event. Three heats were held, with two containing the maximum number of swimmers (eight). The heat in which a swimmer competed did not formally matter for advancement, as the swimmers with the top eight times from the entire field qualified for the finals.

Ryosuke Irie from Japan won the gold medal, two Chinese swimmers Zhang Fenglin and Cheng Feiyi won the silver and bronze medal respectively.

Schedule
All times are China Standard Time (UTC+08:00)

Records

Results

Heats

Final

References
 16th Asian Games Results

External links 
 Men's 200m Backstroke Heats Official Website
 Men's 200m Backstroke Ev.No.18 Final Official Website

Swimming at the 2010 Asian Games